Dendi is the name of several African-related subjects:

 Dendi (province)
 Dendi (woreda) is a district or woreda in Ethiopia;
 Mount Dendi, also in Ethiopia;
 Dendi people is one of the ethnic groups living in Benin and Niger;
 Dendi language (one of the Songhay languages) is spoken by this people.

People with the name Dendi 
 Dendi (gamer), real name Danil Ishutin, Ukrainian esports player
 Clotardo Dendi, South American footballer
 Dendi Santoso, Indonesian footballer